Jan Tille (27 April 1891 – 18 July 1966) was a Czechoslovak fencer. He competed at the 1924 and 1928 Summer Olympics.

References

External links
 

1891 births
1966 deaths
Czechoslovak male fencers
Olympic fencers of Czechoslovakia
Fencers at the 1924 Summer Olympics
Fencers at the 1928 Summer Olympics
Sportspeople from Prague